Janet Davies may refer to:

 Janet Davies (actress) (1927–1986), English actress
 Janet Davies (politician) (born 1939), Plaid Cymru Welsh politician
 Janet Davies, WLS-TV reporter featured in the James Bond short story "Live at Five"

See also
 Jan Davis (born 1953), former American astronaut
 Jan Davis (died 1999), stuntwoman who died BASE jumping from El Capitan
 Janet Davis, former city councillor in Toronto, Ontario, Canada
 Jennet Device, a key witness in 18–19 August 1612 trial of the Lancaster Assizes